The Adelegg is a forested, mountain range, up to  and 112 km² in area, which is part of the northern foothills of the Alps, within the Westallgäu in the south German districts of Ravensburg and Oberallgäu.

Geography

Location 
The Adelegg forms the northernmost foothills of the Allgäu Alps in the southeastern part of the Bavarian Alps and extend a long way out into the Alpine Foreland. They lie between the Untere Argen near Isny to the southwest and west, and Leutkirch to the northwest (both in the Baden-Württemberg district of Ravensburg), and between Altusried to the northeast, Wiggensbach to the east, Buchenberg to the southeast and the Wengener Argen near Weitnau to the south (all in the Bavarian district of Oberallgäu).

The name Adelegg is generally only used for that part of the range located in Württemberg, but the landscape unit of the same name  also includes the Hohentanne Forest to the north-northeast, the Kürnach Forest to the northeast and the Buchenberg Forest to the east. To the south it is adjoined by the mountain ridge of Sonneck on the far side of the Wengener Argen, which is not however part of the Adelegg landscape unit.

Mountains 
The highest mountain in the Adelegg range is the Schwarzer Grat, whose summit is located on Württemberg soil, just a few metres northwest of the Bavarian border, in the province of Tübingen. This peak and other mountains and hills, together with their foothills within the Adelegg range, and the landscape unit of Adelegg - which is higher in places –are sorted below by height in metres (m) above sea level (NN); (BW = Baden-Württemberg; BV = Bavaria):
 Ursersberg (ca. 1,129 m), 1.4 km northwest of Buchenberg-Eschach, BV, highest mountain in the Kürnach Forest
 Hohenkapf (ca. 1,121.1 m), 2.3 km southwest of Buchenberg-Eschach, BV, highest mountain of the Buchenberg Forest
 Schwarzer Grat (1,118.0 m), 2.3 km north-northwest of Weitnau-Wengen, BW, highest mountain of the Adelegg
 unnamed summit (ca. 960 m), 2.2 km west-southwest of Kimratshofen-Walzlings, BV, highest of the Hohentanne Forest

Also only in the Adelegg range:
 Rote Fluh (1,090.0 m), 1 km northeast of the Schwarzer Grat, BW, Adelegg
 Schönbühl (1,074.8 m), 400 m north-northwest of the Schwarzer Grat, BW, Adelegg
 Raggenhorn (1,056.2 m), 1.4 km north-northwest of Weitnau-Wengen, BW und BV, Adelegg
 Hohkopf (1,035.2 m), 2.3 km east-southeast of Isny-Ratzenhofen, BW, Adelegg
 Wegmannshöhe (1,031.8 m), 2.4 km east of Isny-Ratzenhofen, BW, Adelegg
 Ochsenkapf (1,011.7 m), 1.8 km east-southeast of Isny-Ratzenhofen, BW, Adelegg
 Steinbergele (1,009.2 m), 2 km southeast of von Rohrdorf, BW, Adelegg
 Schafberg (1,008.9 m), 900 m south of Isny-Eisenbach, BW, Adelegg
 Rudershöhe (999.2 m), 2.3 km southeast of von Rohrdorf, BW, Adelegg
 Ölberg (961.8 m), 1.5 km east of Rohrdorf, BW, Adelegg
 Herrenberg (931.2 m), 1.8 km northeast of Rohrdorf, BW, Adelegg
 Bärenbühl (930.5 m), 1.2 km northeast of Rohrdorf, BW, Adelegg
 Heidenkopf (918.2 m), 800 m north-northeast of Rohrdorf, BW, Adelegg
 Kapf (885.7 m), 1 km west-southwest of Schmidsfelden, BW, Adelegg

Waterbodies and watersheds 
The Eschach rises in the Buchenberg Forest that adjoins the Adelegg range and runs along the northeastern edge of the range in a mainly northwesterly direction before discharging into the Aitrach, whose waters make their way into the Danube via the northwards running Iller. At the southeastern end of the range is the little pond of Eschacher Weiher which, despite the name, is not connected to the Eschach. The Wengener Argen flows past the Adelegg to the south in an east-west direction and empties into the Untere Argen that runs past the southwestern end of the mountains from southeast to northwest, before its waters flow into Lake Constance and thence into the Rhine. The Adelegg is thus on the  Rhine-Danube Watershed.

Nature reserves 
Small areas of the Adelegg range, totalling 6.4 km² in area, belong to the Adelegg Special Area of Conservation Region (No. 8326-341). Large parts lie in the protected area of Adelegg and Associated Tertiary Hill Foreland (Adelegg und zugehöriges tertiäres Hügelvorland) (LSG No. 319441), which covers 68.14 km² and was founded on 31 March 1994.

Economy and tourism 
The Adelegg is used primarily for forestry and tourism. In the Modern Era, but possibly also in the Late Middle Ages, there were various glassworks here; one that may still be visited in the glassworks in the former glassmaking village of Schmidsfelden.

Hiking across the Adelegg is possible on the 320 km long Black Forest-Swabian Jura-Allgäu Way and the 185 km long  Heuberg-Allgäu Way. There are also winter sports facilities, especially in the Buchenberg Forest area.

References

Sources 
 Rudi Holzberger, Manfred Thierer: Die Adelegg, Das dunkle Herz des Allgäus, Wanderungen und Streifzüge 2009, .

External links 

 http://www.adelegg.info/ – Geology, People, Plants, Animals
 http://www.adelegg.de/

Ravensburg (district)
Oberallgäu
Allgäu Alps
Mountain ranges of the Alps
Mountain and hill ranges of Baden-Württemberg
Mountain ranges of Bavaria